Harlan Price (born January 25, 1976 in Jasper, Florida U.S.) is a Mountain Bike Skills instructor and former professional mountain bike racer. Harlan Price raced for Independent Fabrication from 2006–09, won the National Ultra Endurance 100 miler series in 2006 and placed in the top 5 for multiple years. His instruction business TakeAim Cycling LLC has been in operation since 2011 and is based out of Harrisonburg VA.

References

Living people
1976 births
American male cyclists
American mountain bikers
People from Jasper, Florida